Alice Barlow (born 9 August 1991) is an English actress and singer, best known for her role as Rae Wilson in the Channel 4 soap opera Hollyoaks.

Education
Barlow attended The Fallibroome Academy in Macclesfield.

Career
While a teenager Barlow won a national talent search Festival4Stars. In 2008, Barlow took part 'The Stobart Factor' a talent competition, which was judged by The X Factor judge Louis Walsh. Walsh gave Barlow positive comments on her singing and told her she had 'style'. Alice went on to win the competition and won £10,000, in which she put towards an Invisalign to straighten her teeth.

In October 2009, Alice made her television debut as Rae Wilson in Channel 4, Soap-opera, Hollyoaks. While at Hollyoaks, Barlow won an All About Soap award for "Best Love Triangle", along with Kieron Richardson and Emmett J. Scanlan. In early 2011, Barlow decided to leave the serial and her character was killed off in the late night spin-off Hollyoaks Later, which aired in September 2011. Barlow's departure was kept a secret until her exit scenes were aired. While starring in the show she also presented linked project The Hollyoaks Music Show. In 2012 Barlow secured the role of Bella in ITV drama series Crime Stories.

On 15 February 2013, Digital Spy reported that Barlow had auditioned on the second series of The Voice UK and has got through to the next round with Danny O'Donoghue as her coach. Barlow was defeated in the battle rounds by Andrea Begley, the eventual winner of the show. Following her elimination from the talent contest Barlow vowed to continue her ambition of a career in music.

On 10 July, Barlow's management announced that she had secured the role of Sara in a new E4's comedy titled Drifters. In 2014, Barlow filmed a guest appearance for the medical drama Casualty. For 2015, Barlow secured a recurring role in ITV comedy Benidorm and a guest role in Russell T Davies' series Banana.

In 2018, Barlow secured the role of Kat in the Dusty Springfield musical "Son Of A Preacher Man".

Filmography

References

External links
 
 Alice Barlow – The Voice Profile at BBC Online

1991 births
Living people
21st-century English women singers
21st-century English singers
English soap opera actresses
English television actresses
People from Macclesfield
Actresses from Cheshire
Musicians from Cheshire
Place of birth missing (living people)
The Voice UK contestants